DWV may refer to:

 Deformed Wing Virus, a disease of honeybees
 Deutscher Staatsbahnwagenverband, the German railway wagon association formed in 1909
 Deutscher Wanderverband, the German Hiking Association
 Deutscher Wehrverein, the German Defence Union (1919-1935)
 Drain-Waste-Vent (DWV) system
 DWV, a Dutch football club from Amsterdam
 DWV (group), American pop group